Leap into Bliss (German: Salto in die Seligkeit) is a 1934 Austrian comedy film directed by Fritz Schulz and starring Schulz, Olly Gebauer and Rosy Barsony. It was one of a number of Austrian films made by newly founded independent film companies by German filmmakers who were forced to leave Nazi Germany after 1933 - a cycle which ended with the Anchluss of 1938.

Cast
 Fritz Schulz - Fritz Wiesinger 
 Olly Gebauer -  Anny 
 Rosy Barsony - Ilona, ein Revuestar 
 Felix Bressart - Kriegel, Geheimdetektiv 
 Josef Rehberger - Rudi May, Inhaber Warenhaus May 
 Tibor Halmay - Karl, ein ehemaliger Artist 
 Fritz Imhoff - Ein Herr aus Linz 
 Hans Homma - Braun - Geschäftsführer 
 Iris Arlan - Mrs. Huber 
 Hans Unterkircher - Baron Rivoli 
 Illa Raudnitz - Verkäuferin im Warenhaus

References

Bibliography
 Kohl, Katrin & Robertson, Ritchie. A History of Austrian Literature 1918-2000. Camden House, 2006.

External links

1934 films
1934 comedy films
Austrian comedy films
1930s German-language films
Austrian black-and-white films
Films directed by Fritz Schulz